In computer-aided geometric design a control point is a member of a set of points used to determine the shape of a spline curve or, more generally, a surface or higher-dimensional object.

For Bézier curves, it has become customary to refer to the -vectors  in a parametric representation  of a curve or surface in -space as control points,  while the scalar-valued functions , defined over the relevant parameter domain, are the corresponding weight or blending functions. 
This property implies that the curve lies within the convex hull of its control points. This is the case for Bézier's representation of a polynomial curve as well as for the B-spline representation of a spline curve or tensor-product spline surface.

References

Splines (mathematics)